Four Four West Village, or Forty-Four West Village (sometimes partly transliterated as SiSi West Village due to its vernacular name is ) was a resident area in Taipei for the military personnel of the 44th Arsenal of Combined Logistics Command and their dependents, completed in June 1949. Originally, it is said to have housed 300 households.

The government built the village along with Four Four East Village, after more troops were transferred to Taiwan and the capacity of Four Four South Village thus became to small. During the year of turmoil 1949, in total, more than six hundred thousand troops and two million "dependents" retreated from China to Taiwan. The majority of military residents in Four Four West Village had a rather high position in the army, as lieutenants or as field grade officers, whereas the general soldiers lived in Four Four East Village and craftsmen and civilians lived in Four Four South Village. The resident environment was considered premium and the descendants usually enjoyed a better education. Every house had a garden and a yard.

Along with the other military dependents' villages which were built to accommodate the immigrants (which consisted mostly of soldiers and their dependents) during the immigration wave across the Taiwan Strait following the failure of the Nationalist government during the civil war between the Kuomintang and the Communist Party of China, the villages were named Zhuliba.

Zhongtuo Community 

The area is now known as the Zhongtuo Community, a public housing project, which in 1991 occupied a floor area of 4.1 hectares in Taipei's Xinyi District, encompassing parts of Keelung Road, Guangfu Road and sections of Xinyi Road.

Zhongtuo Community and Four Four West Village have been one of the subjects of a bilingual Chinese-English web project called "This is My Land", prepared by seven grade students, parent volunteers and school instructors of the Taipei Municipal Ming-Hu Junior High School starting in 2005. According to their on-site observations, no original remains of the Four Four West Village were preserved after the re-purposing of the area through the Zhongtuo public housing project, which encompassed thirty-five apartment buildings. The vernacular history of many other military dependents' villages have equally become lost through their redevelopment as public housing communities. The "This is My Land" project transliterated and translated the neighborhood's name into English as "Zhongtuo Community", "Zhongtuo Public Housing Community" or "Zhongtuo Public Housing".

The construction of the Zhongtuo Community housing blocks, which includes twelve-stories high apartments, started in 1979 and were completed in 1983. Because the military and the Taipei City Government jointly arranged the construction, residents stopped being of exclusively "military" nature. The area's third zone houses the Taipei Municipal Xinyi Preschool, entailing an indoor area of 1121 square meters and 831 square meters outdoors. The Taiwanese artist Ryan Kuo (zh) has been noted living in Zhongtuo Community.

See also
 Four Four South Village

References

External links 
 Four Four West Village in the "This is My Land" project by the Taipei Municipal Ming-Hu Junior High School (English and Traditional Chinese).

Neighbourhoods in Taipei
Military of the Republic of China